Airways International Cymru was an airline based in Cardiff, Wales formed by Red Dragon Travel, at the time a leading Welsh travel agency and tour operator. It commenced operations in early 1984, and ceased all operations in early 1988 after financial difficulties arising from the lease of an aircraft to an American airline.

History

The airline commenced operations in 1984 offering flights to popular European holiday destinations. It was based in Cardiff, Wales and started operations with a single British Aircraft Corporation BAC One-Eleven (BAC 1-11-300) G-YMRU purchased from Quebecair of Canada. For the first summer season of operations it also leased a BAC 1-11-400 G-AXMU from British airline British Island Airways. Later in 1984 it introduced a further BAC 1-11-300 G-WLAD purchased from Quebecair as a replacement for the British Island Airways aircraft.

In 1985 it introduced an ex Britannia Airways Boeing 737-200 G-BAZI leased from GPA.

In 1986 it received its first Boeing 737-300 G-PROC, and this was used to expand destinations to popular holiday spots throughout Europe.

In 1987 it received a new Boeing 737-300 G-BNCT. Additional contracts saw the lease of a further Boeing 737-300 G-PROK for the summer of 1987. After the European summer season, this Boeing 737-300 was leased to an American airline, SunCoast Airlines. Difficulties regarding the contract, and a lack of payment for the lease led to financial difficulties, and in early 1988 the airline's aircraft were repossessed by their lenders.

Throughout the airline's history, the operational fleet was reduced during the winter months by leasing out of aircraft to other operators. These included Air New Zealand, Aer Lingus, British Midland Airways and Manx Airlines.

Destinations 

Airways International Cymru served 20 destinations across Europe (during operations).

Austria
Salzburg – Salzburg Airport
Canary Islands
Gran Canaria – Gran Canaria Airport
Tenerife – Tenerife South Airport
France
Paris – Orly Airport
Germany
Düsseldorf – Düsseldorf Airport
Hanover – Hanover Airport
Netherlands
Rotterdam – Rotterdam Airport
Italy
Milan – Milan Malpensa Airport
Portugal
Faro – Faro Airport
Spain
Palma de Mallorca – Palma de Mallorca Airport
Girona – Girona-Costa Brava Airport
Switzerland
Basel – EuroAirport Basel-Mulhouse-Freiburg
Geneva – Geneva Cointrin Airport 
Scotland
Aberdeen - Aberdeen Airport
Edinburgh - Edinburgh Airport
Glasgow - Glasgow Airport
United Kingdom
England
Birmingham – Birmingham Airport
Bristol – Bristol Airport
Derby/Leicester/Nottingham – East Midlands Airport
Exeter – Exeter Airport
London – Gatwick Airport
Southend – Southend Airport
Wales
Cardiff – Cardiff Airport, base

Fleet

See also
 List of defunct airlines of the United Kingdom

References

External links

Fleet data

Defunct airlines of the United Kingdom
Companies based in Cardiff
Airlines established in 1984
Airlines disestablished in 1988
1984 establishments in Wales
1988 disestablishments in Wales
British companies established in 1984
British companies disestablished in 1988